Two Rivers School District No. 10 is a public school district in Yell, Perry, and Conway counties, Arkansas, United States. Two Rivers, headquartered in an unincorporated area in Yell County near Ola, consists of two schools including Two Rivers Elementary and Two Rivers High; it previously operated Ola Elementary School/Ola High School, the Fourche Valley School, and Plainview–Rover Elementary School/Plainview–Rover High School.

The service area includes Ola, Plainview, Rover, Casa, Briggsville, and Centerville.

The school district and high school's name was chosen because of proximity to the Petit Jean River and Fourche La Fave River.

History
The district was formed on July 1, 2004 as a result of the consolidation of four former school districts:

 Fourche Valley School District
 Ola School District
 Perry–Casa School District
 Plainview–Rover School District

By 2004 new laws were passed requiring school districts with enrollments below 350 to consolidate with other school districts. As a result the Perry-Casa and Ola boards agreed to have a consolidation in which Perry-Casa absorbs Ola, and voters of those districts approved the consolidation. Ola and Perry-Casa then notified the Fourche Valley and Plainview-Rover districts that they were merging; the leaderships of these two districts wished to avoid consolidations ordered by the state, so they asked the Arkansas Board of Education if they could voluntarily consolidate with Ola.

In the 2010–11 school year, the district served more than 900 students.

There was a proposed millage to pay for a safe room at Two Rivers Elementary, but it was voted down in 2017 by 59% of the voters. Perry County voters accused the district of attempting to prevent their vote by putting polling locations only in Yell County.

Geography 
Within Yell County the service area includes the municipalities of Ola and Plainview and the census-designated places of Centerville and Rover. The district also includes the unincorporated areas of Bluffton, Briggsville, Fourche Valley, Gravelly, and Wing in Yell County.

Within Perry County the service area includes Casa. The district also includes sections of Conway County, and Scott County.

Briggsville is the westernmost area in the district, while the easternmost area is Perry.

Schools 
Current:
 Two Rivers High School – serving grades 7 through 12; based in unincorporated Yell County.
 Two Rivers Elementary School – serving prekindergarten through grade 6; based in unincorporated Yell County.

Former:
 Fourche Valley Elementary School/Fourche Valley High School
 Ola High School
 Plainview–Rover High School
 Ola Elementary School – serving prekindergarten through grade 6; based in Ola.
 Ola Elementary School had four buildings; the main building and gymnasium were made of natural rock and opened in 1941.
 Plainview–Rover Elementary School (later Plainview Elementary School) – serving prekindergarten through grade 6; based in Plainview.

In 2010 Ola High and Plainview-Rover High closed as Two Rivers High opened. In 2012 Ola Elementary and Plainview Elementary closed as Two Rivers Elementary opened.

The district previously operated the Fourche Valley School, which was K-12. In 2009 the majority of the members of the district board voted to close it. The Arkansas Board of Education and the Arkansas Supreme Court ultimately upheld the closure despite protests from Fourche Valley parents.

Demographics
 most district residents believe in Protestantism and are White Americans.

Mascots 
The current mascot of Two Rivers is the Gators.

Previously each school has its own mascot that served as its athletic emblem:
 Ola Elementary = Mustangs
 Plainview–Rover = Panthers
 Fourche Valley = Indians

References

Further reading
Maps of the district and predecessor districts:
 2004-2005 School District Map
 Map of Arkansas School Districts pre-July 1, 2004
  (Download)
  (Download)
  (Download)

External links 

 
 
 Decision from the  Arkansas Supreme Court regarding the closure of the Fourche Valley School
 Two Rivers School District No. 10 Yell County, Arkansas Regulatory Basis Financial Statements and Other Reports June 30, 2017

School districts in Arkansas
Education in Perry County, Arkansas
Education in Yell County, Arkansas
Education in Conway County, Arkansas
Education in Scott County, Arkansas
2004 establishments in Arkansas
School districts established in 2004